The 14th Alpini Regiment is an active unit of the Italian Army's mountain infantry speciality, the Alpini, which distinguished itself in combat during World War I and World War II.

History 
The regiment was created on 5 February 1993 by elevating the existing Alpini Battalion "Tolmezzo" to regiment. Between 1 October 1909 and 30 September 1975 the battalion was one of the battalions of the 8th Alpini Regiment. After the 8th Alpini Regiment was disbanded during the 1975 Italian Army reform the "Tolmezzo" battalion, based in Paluzza, became one of the battalions of the Alpine Brigade "Julia". As the traditions and flag of the 8th Alpini Regiment were assigned to the "Gemona" battalion, the Tolmezzo was granted a new war flag on 12 November 1976 by decree 846 of the President of the Italian Republic Giovanni Leone. The two Gold Medals of Military Valour awarded to the 8th Alpini Regiment, were duplicated for the new flag of the Tolmezzo, while the three Silver Medals of Military Valour awarded to the Tolmezzo were transferred from the flag of the 8th Alpini to the Tolmezzo's flag. These were awarded for its conduct at the battles of Assaba on 20–23 March 1913, and Ettangi on 18 June 1913 in Libya, and for its conduct at the Battle of Pal Piccolo, Pal Grande, and Freikofel on 24 May 1915 on the Italian Front.

For its conduct and work after the 1976 Friuli earthquake the Tolmezzo was awarded a Silver Medal of Army Valour, which was affixed to the battalion's war flag and added to the battalion's coat of arms. The battalion's 12th Company in Moggio Udinese was hit hard by the earthquake and suffered severe casualties, nonetheless the company immediately commenced rescue efforts in the severely affected Moggio Udinese. For its commitment to save lives the 12th Company was one of only three companies, which were awarded a Silver Medal of Army Valour after the Friuli earthquake.

In 1993 the regiment participated in the United Nations Operation in Mozambique for which it was awarded a Silver Cross of Army Merit. In 2005 the army downsized its forces and the 14th Alpini Regiment was disbanded on 14 October 2005, and the next day the Alpini Battalion "Gemona" of the 8th Alpini Regiment was renamed Alpini Battalion "Tolmezzo".

Structure 
When the regiment was disbanded it had the following structure:

  Regimental Command
  Command and Logistic Support Company
  Alpini Battalion "Tolmezzo"
  6th Alpini Company "La bella"
  12th Alpini Company "La terribile"
  72nd Alpini Company "La cazzuta"
  114th Mortar Company "La valanga"
  212th Anti-Tank Company "Val Tagliamento" (from 2001 onwards)

2022 Reactivation 
On 4 October 2022 the flag and traditions of the 14th Alpini Regiment were given to the Command and Tactical Supports Unit "Julia" of the Alpine Brigade "Julia".

As of reactivation the unit is organized as follows:

  14th Alpini Command and Tactical Supports Unit, in Udine
 Command Company
 Signal Company

External links
 14th Alpini Regiment on vecio.it

Sources 
 Franco dell'Uomo, Rodolfo Puletti: "L'Esercito Italiano verso il 2000 - Volume Primo - Tomo I", Rome 1998, Stato Maggiore dell'Esercito - Ufficio Storico, page: 504

References 

Alpini regiments of Italy
Military units and formations established in 1993
Military units and formations established in 2005